Chinavia is a genus of green stink bugs in the family Pentatomidae. There are more than 30 described species in Chinavia.

Species
These 33 species belong to the genus Chinavia:

 Chinavia armigera Stal, 1859
 Chinavia aseada Rolston, 1983
 Chinavia brasicola Rolston, 1983
 Chinavia bufo Distant, 1893
 Chinavia cearensis
 Chinavia difficilis
 Chinavia erythrocnemis
 Chinavia geniculata
 Chinavia gravis Walker, 1867
 Chinavia hilaris (green stink bug)
 Chinavia immaculata
 Chinavia impicticornis Stal, 1872
 Chinavia marginata
 Chinavia musiva Berg, 1878
 Chinavia napaea
 Chinavia nigritarsis Stal, 1872
 Chinavia nigropicta Breddin, 1906
 Chinavia obstinata
 Chinavia panamensis
 Chinavia pengue Rolston, 1983
 Chinavia pensylvanica
 Chinavia perezi Faúndez, Carvajal & Rider, 2013
 Chinavia pontagrossensis
 Chinavia rideri
 Chinavia rogenhoferi
 Chinavia runapsis (Dallas, 1851)
 Chinavia runaspis Dallas, 1851
 Chinavia schuhi Schwertner & Grazia, 2006
 Chinavia scutellata
 Chinavia sebastiaoi
 Chinavia tuiucauna
 Chinavia ubica Rolston, 1983
 Chinavia vanduzeei Schwertner & Grazia, 2006

References

Further reading

External links

 

Nezarini